Prognoz may refer to:

Prognoz (satellite), a Soviet space science programme
US-KMO, a series of early warning satellites sometimes mistakenly called Prognoz